Sarai Naga is a historical village on state highway 16 in b/w Kotkapura, Muktsar, Punjab, India. It is the birthplace of 2nd guru of Sikhs, Guru Angad. This village was earlier known as Matte-di-Sarai.

References

Villages in Sri Muktsar Sahib district
Caravanserais in India